Józef Kożdoń (8 September 1873 in Leszna Górna in Cieszyn County - 7 December 1949 in Opava) was Silesian autonomist politician.

Biography 
He was a teacher (since 1893) and principal (since 1902) of elementary school in Strumień (1893–1898) and Skoczów (1898–1918), active member of Country Teachers Union in Austrian Silesia, founder of Polish public reading-room in Strumień and co-founder of German Reader's Association (Ger. Leseverein) in Skoczów, founder (since summer 1908) and leader of Silesian People's Party (1909–1938), co-founder and general secretary of Union of Silesians (1910–1938) in East Silesia, spokesman of autonomy or independence of Silesia and spokesman of Silesian nation, founder of Committee for the Maintenance of Clearness of the Silesian dialect in 1910, the deputy of Silesian Parliament in Opava in the period 1909-1918, member of the town council in Skoczów since 1911, editor of most popular Silesian newspaper in East Silesia "Ślązak" (Silesian) and magazine "Śląski Kalendarz Ludowy" (Silesian People's Calendar), member of the Austrian Committee to Support for Soldiers' Families in the period 1914-1918, since October to December 1918 political prisoner in Polish prison in Kraków. Kożdoń was also a member of the Czechoslovak delegation at the Paris Peace Conference in 1919, member of Administration Commission for Country Silesia in Opava in the period 1919-1927, four-time mayor of Český Těšín in the period 1923-1938, author of many political articles, letters, petitions and brochures, for example author of petition "representation of Silesian nationality" to Sir Walter Runciman in the question of plebiscite in the Cieszyn Silesia in 1938. He was also founder (1925) and president (in the period 1940-1944) of Silesian People's Bank.

Controversies 
Kożdoń wrote: "I'm not a German, but I'm not and I don't want to be a Pole, too. I'm Polish speaking Silesian [...] A language commonwealth don't decide about a national union, deciding factor is spirit commonwealth. Silesia has this commonwealth - own separate land's traditions". His politics supported bilingual Polish-German education, for example Kożdoń supported insertion of German language to Polish elementary school in Górki Wielkie and demanded insertion of Polish language to German grammar and gymnasial schools in Cieszyn. His politics supported German-language Silesian culture, Slavic Silesian folk culture and local Slavic Silesian dialects. Kożdoń's stances on the position of German culture in Cieszyn Silesia remain however controversial, as several historians claim he and his supporters accented German character of the whole Cieszyn Silesia and supported Germanization policies.

On 18 September 1938 Walter Harbich, as leader of "assembly of Silesian nationality", sent a telegram to Adolf Hitler, requesting independence of Cieszyn Silesia under a protection of Nazi Germany. Petition in the same question was sent to the prime minister of the UK Neville Chamberlain, too. On 2 October 1938 Rudolf Francus and Walter Harbich - leaders of German-language faction of Silesian People's Party sent a next telegram to Hitler, speaking in protest of Silesian people and German people from Bohumín against cession of the Zaolzie to Poland. All the telegrams were sent without knowledge of Kożdoń.

Works 

 KOŽDON Josef, Über die Sonderstellung der schlesischen Polen, die nationalen Verhältnisse und die allpolnische Propaganda in Ostschlesien (Beilage Rede des Landtagabg[eordneten] Koždon in der Budgetdebatte des schlesischen Landtages (44. Sitzung) am 8. November 1910), Skotschau 1910.
 KOŽDON Josef, Denkschrift der Schles[ischen] Volkspartei an die Interallierte Volksabstimmungkommission in Teschen, (Teschen 1920).
 KOŻDOŃ Józef, Krzyk rozpaczy o pomoc dla Ślązaków (dodatek skargi i żale Śląskiej Partyi Ludowej do międzynarodowej Komisyi plebiscytowej w Cieszynie w sprawie polskich aktów gwałtu i terroru), Morawska Ostrawa 1920.
 KOŽDON Josef, 4. Beschwerde-Eingabe der schlesischen Volkspartei an die internationale Volksabstimmungkommission in Teschen, (Mährisch Ostrau) 1920.
 [KOŻDOŃ Józef], Memoryał Śląskiej Partyi Ludowej w sprawie plebiscytu w Księstwie Cieszyńskim wystosowany do Międzynarodowej Komisyi Plebiscytowej w Cieszynie, (Morawska Ostrawa) 1920.
 KOŽDON Josef, Das Recht unserer schlesischen Heimat auf die verwaltungmässige Selbständigkeit, Troppau 1927.
 KOZDON Josef, Teschen und Teschner Land, Sonderdruck aus dem Werk „Schlesien“ Band 8, Berlin-Fiedenau 1930.
 KOŽDON Josef, "Aus der jüngster Geschichte der Teschener Landes – Erinnerungen und Erlebnisse", in: Schlesisches Jahrbuch, Breslau 1940.
 KOŻDOŃ Józef, Mój stosunek do Polski, Polaków i do ludności naszej, Cz. Cieszyn 1946.
 KOŽDOŇ Josef, Moje zkušenosti ve službě vlasti, můj osud, Opava 1948.

See also 
 Silesian People's Party
 Josef Cichy
 Union of Upper Silesians
 Ewald Latacz
 Joseph Musiol
 Theofil Kupka
 Silesian Autonomy Movement

References

Sources 
 Piotr Dobrowolski, Ugrupowania i kierunki separatystyczne na Górnym Śląsku i w Cieszyńskim w latach 1918-1939, PWN, Warszawa, Kraków 1972.
 
 Kevin Hannan, Borders of Language and Identity in Teschen Silesia, New York 1996 
 Dariusz Jerczyński, Historia Narodu Śląskiego (History of Silesian Nation), second edition (implemented and corrected), Zabrze 2006, 
 Tomasz Kamusella, Silesia and Central European Nationalisms: The Emergence of National and Ethnic Groups in Prussian Silesia and Austrian Silesia, 1848-1918 (Ser: Central European Studies; foreword by Professor Charles W. Ingrao). 2007. West Lafayette, IN: Purdue University Press, 386 pp. 
 Upper Silesia 1870-1920: Between Region, Religion, Nation and Ethnicity: journal article by Tomasz Kamusella; East European Quarterly, Vol. 38, 2004

1873 births
1949 deaths
People from Cieszyn County
People from Austrian Silesia
Members of the Diet of Austrian Silesia
Austrian politicians
Czechoslovak politicians
Silesian politicians
Cooperative organizers
Upper Silesian independence activists
Austro-Hungarian people